This is a list of major battles in the Hundred Years' War, a conflict between France and England that lasted 116 years from 1337 to 1453. There are 60 of them.

References

Hundred Years' War